Marzabad or Merzabad may refer to:
 Marzabad, Khoda Afarin, East Azerbaijan Province
 Marzabad, Varzaqan, East Azerbaijan Province
 Marzabad, Ilam
 Marzabad, South Khorasan